Shaker Ismail (born 1927) is an Iraqi former international football player, who was one of the first players to play in first Iraq national football team. He also played for Al-Minaa.

International career
Ismail played against Iraq in April 1951 in a friendly match between Iraq national football team, and Basra Select XI. The Basra XI was composed of 10 players from Al-Minaa and Ismail from Sharikat Naft Al-Basra.  Two of Basra’s players, Ismail and Karim Allawi, caught the eye of the coach Dhia Habib and were added to the squad, bound for Turkey.

In April 1951, Ismail started playing for the first Iraq national football team, He was called by coach Dhia Habib to play in the first international friendly in the history of Iraqi football. On 6 May 1951, Ismail played his first international against Turkey B in Turkey, which ended 7–0 for Turkey B.

Honours

Club
Iraq FA Cup
 Winner 1948–49 with Sharikat Naft Al-Basra

References

External links
  Iraqi national team players database
  Iraq - Record International Players/Hassanin Mubarak
 History of Iraqi Sports, 1951
 Al-Minaa Club: Sailors of south

1927 births
Iraqi footballers
Association football forwards
Al-Mina'a SC players
Sportspeople from Basra
Iraq international footballers
Possibly living people